Americans in the United Arab Emirates are residents of the United Arab Emirates (UAE) who originate from the United States. As of 2015, there are over 50,000 Americans living in the country.

Demographics
The majority of Americans are based in Dubai. Due to the extensive military cooperation between both countries, there is also around 5,000 American military personnel stationed at the Al Dhafra Air Base in Abu Dhabi. The base, which is operated jointly, is one of the key US military bases in the region.

Education
There are numerous American international schools in the UAE, serving expatriate students. Some of the notable schools are the American Community School of Abu Dhabi, American International School in Abu Dhabi, American School of Dubai, Dubai American Academy, GEMS American Academy and the Sharjah American International School. In addition, there are also several American-accredited universities in the country, such as the American University in Dubai, Hult International Business School, International Horizons College, Rochester Institute of Technology - Dubai, the New York University Abu Dhabi and the American University of Sharjah.

Organisations
The United States has an embassy in Abu Dhabi and a consulate-general in Dubai which provide services to American citizens. There are also expatriate and business organizations, such as the American Women's Association in Dubai, the American Women's Network of Abu Dhabi an American Chamber of Commerce Abu Dhabi and an American Business Council of Dubai and the Northern Emirates.

See also
 United Arab Emirates–United States relations
 American diaspora
 Emirati American

References

External links
 Embassy of the United States, Abu Dhabi
 Consulate General of the United States, Dubai

 
United Arab Emirates
 Ethnic groups in the United Arab Emirates